Postboy or Post boy may refer to:

Postboy (ship), an Australian ship
Postboy, Ohio, a community in the United States
Post boy, another name for Postilion
Boston Post-Boy, an American newspaper